Makhin (also Romanized as Makhīn) is a village in Qatur Rural District of Qatur District of Khoy County, West Azerbaijan province, Iran. At the 2006 National Census, its population was 1,170 in 229 households. The following census in 2011 counted 1,327 people in 321 households. The latest census in 2016 showed a population of 1,306 people in 338 households; it was the largest village in its rural district.

References 

Khoy County

Populated places in West Azerbaijan Province

Populated places in Khoy County